Isabelle LaMal (July 16, 1886 – July 20, 1952) was an American film actress. Born in New Orleans, Louisiana, she appeared in over 95 films between 1928 and 1951.

LaMal is best known for her appearance as Mrs. Bedford, socialite owner of prized poodle Garçon, in the Three Stooges short subject Calling All Curs. She also appeared as society matron Clara in Ants in the Pantry. Other film appearances include An American in Paris, Think Fast, Mr. Moto and the Our Gang short subject Mike Fright.

LaMal died on July 20, 1952.

Selected filmography
 Storm Over the Andes (1935)
 Should Wives Work? (1937)
 Sagebrush Serenade (1939)
 Escort Girl (1941)
 The Lone Rider Rides On (1941)
 Queen of Broadway (1942)

References

External links

1886 births
1952 deaths
American film actresses
Actresses from New Orleans
20th-century American actresses